Ince was a parliamentary constituency in England which elected one Member of Parliament (MP) to the House of Commons of the Parliament of the United Kingdom.  It comprised the town of Ince-in-Makerfield and other towns south of Wigan.

It was created by the Redistribution of Seats Act 1885 as a division of the parliamentary county of Lancashire. The constituency boundaries were redrawn in 1918 and 1950, and in 1974 it was reclassified as a borough constituency.

The constituency ceased to exist with the implementation of the 1983 boundary changes and was largely replaced by the Makerfield Parliamentary constituency.

Boundaries

1885–1918
The constituency, officially designated as South-West Lancashire, Ince Division consisted of parishes south of, but not including, the town of Wigan, namely:
Abram
Haigh
Hindley
Ince-in-Makerfield
Orrell
Pemberton

The electorate also included the freeholders of the municipal borough of Wigan who were entitled to vote in the county.

1918–1950
The Representation of the People Act 1918 reorganised constituencies throughout the United Kingdom. Boundaries were adjusted and seats were defined in terms of the districts created by the Local Government Act 1894. According to the schedules of the Act, the Lancashire, Ince Division comprised:

Abram Urban District
Ashton in Makerfield Urban District
Billinge Urban District
Ince-in-Makerfield Urban District
Orrell Urban District
Standish with Langtree Urban District
The civil parish of Shevington from Wigan Rural District

1950–1983
The Representation of the People Act 1948 redistributed parliamentary seats, with the constituencies first being used in the general election of 1950. The term "county constituency" was introduced in place of "division". Ince County Constituency was redefined as consisting of seven urban districts:

Abram
Ashton in Makerfield
Billinge & Winstanley
Ince-in-Makerfield
Orrell
Skelmersdale
Upholland

The changes reflected local government boundary changes that had taken place, and the renaming of Billinge UD as "Billinge and Winstanley" in 1924. Standish with Langtree and Shevington were transferred to the Westhoughton county constituency. Skelmersdale and Upholland had previously formed part of the Ormskirk division.

The Parliamentary Constituencies (England) Order 1970 altered the seat's name to Ince Borough Constituency. The constituency was defined as consisting of six urban districts: Abram, Ashton in Makerfield, Billinge & Winstanley, Ince-in-Makerfield, Orrell, and Skelmersdale & Holland. Skelmersdale and Upholland urban districts had been amalgamated in 1968, and the 1970 boundaries were the same as those of 1950.

Abolition
The constituency was abolished by the Parliamentary Constituencies (England) Order 1983, which redrew constituencies based on the new counties and districts created in 1974. Most of the area (Abram, Orrell and Winstanley) was included in the Makerfield County Constituency, in the parliamentary county of Greater Manchester. Ashton in Makerfield and Billinge was divided between Makerfield Constituency, in Greater Manchester, and St Helens North Borough Constituency in Merseyside; Skelmersdale & Upholland formed part of West Lancashire County Constituency.

Members of Parliament

Election results

Elections in the 1880s

Elections in the 1890s

Elections in the 1900s

Elections in the 1910s

Elections in the 1920s

Elections in the 1930s

Elections in the 1940s

Elections in the 1950s

Election in the 1960s

Elections in the 1970s

See also
Makerfield parliamentary constituency.

References

Sources 

Election results, 1950–1979

Parliamentary constituencies in North West England (historic)
Constituencies of the Parliament of the United Kingdom established in 1885
Constituencies of the Parliament of the United Kingdom disestablished in 1983
Politics of the Metropolitan Borough of Wigan